Elizabeth Shannon may refer to:
Elizabeth Killigrew, Viscountess Shannon, mistress of Charles II of England
Shannon Elizabeth, actress